Kalateh-ye Bala (also Romanized as Kalāteh-ye Bālā; also known as Kalāt-e Bālā and Kalateh Bala Tabas Masina) is a village in Doreh Rural District, in the Central District of Sarbisheh County, South Khorasan Province, Iran. At the 2006 census, its population was 228, in 63 families.

References 

Populated places in Sarbisheh County